Basurhat A. H. C. Government High School is a secondary school located in Basurhat municipality, Companiganj Upazila, Noakhali District, Bangladesh. The school was established in 1911. Basurhat A.H.C. Govt. High School is the oldest high school of Companiganj.

The elaboration of A.H.C. is Abdul Halim Coronation. Mr. Abdul Halim was the great founder and proposer of this school. Abdul Halim was the sub-registrar of Basurhat sub-registry office. When Companiganj has no educational institution he felt the necessity to establish a school. Consequently, Mr. Abdul Halim established Basurhat A.H.C. High School and Ramgonj Coronation High School. Moulobi Emdad Ullah helped Mr. Halim very cordially to establish the school. He donated the lands for the school. They made the school fund by collecting donation from the people. The school got the status of governmental school at 1972.

References

Schools in Noakhali District
Companiganj Upazila, Noakhali